Walter George Webster (22 May 1895 – 1980) was an English professional footballer who played as a full back in the Football League, most notably for Walsall.

Career statistics

References 

English footballers
English Football League players
Association football fullbacks
1895 births
1980 deaths
Sportspeople from West Bromwich
Walsall F.C. players
Lincoln City F.C. players
Sheffield United F.C. players
Worksop Town F.C. players
Scunthorpe United F.C. players
Torquay United F.C. players
Rochdale A.F.C. players
Stalybridge Celtic F.C. players
Barrow A.F.C. players
Workington A.F.C. players
Midland Football League players
Mossley A.F.C. players